Danny Dunlop is a Canadian filmmaker from London, Ontario, whose debut feature film Wolves was released in 2022.

A graduate of Fanshawe College and the University of Western Ontario, Dunlop wrote and directed various short films, and had cinematography credits on films by other directors, prior to making Wolves. He launched his own production company, Black Wave, in 2012.

Wolves was nominated for the John Dunning Best First Feature Award at the 11th Canadian Screen Awards in 2023.

References

External links

21st-century Canadian screenwriters
21st-century Canadian male writers
Canadian male screenwriters
Canadian cinematographers
Canadian film editors
Film directors from London, Ontario
Film producers from Ontario
Canadian film production company founders
Fanshawe College alumni
University of Western Ontario alumni
Living people